San Leandro High School (SLHS) is a four-year public high school in San Leandro, California, USA.  

It is often cited as the only comprehensive high school in the San Leandro Unified School District (SLUSD).

Academics
Academic courses include Advanced Placement (AP) and Honors courses. Under the "school within a school" model, SLHS operates the Academy of Business & Finance (BA), San Leandro Academy for Multimedia (SLAM), and Social Justice Academy (SJA).

Career Technical Education (CTE) courses include Auto Technology, Engineering & Design, Graphic Design, and Wood Shop.

AP Courses 
San Leandro High School offers the following Advanced Placement courses:

 AP 2-D Art & Design 
 AP Biology 
 AP Calculus AB
 AP Calculus BC 
 AP Chemistry 
 AP Chinese Language & Culture 
 AP Computer Science A 
 AP Computer Science Principles
 AP English Language & Composition
 AP English Literature & Composition
 AP Environmental Science 
 AP French Language & Culture 
 AP Macroeconomics 
 AP Microeconomics
 AP Physics 1 
 AP Physics 2 
 AP Psychology
 AP Spanish Language & Culture 
 AP Statistics 
 AP U.S. Government & Politics 
 AP U.S. History
 AP World History

Facilities 
The current San Leandro High School building opened in 1949, and the three-story science building opened in 2003. The main campus also includes a career technical education building, track-and-field, baseball/softball diamond, tennis courts, and swimming pool. 

In 2007, land was purchased for a new building to house the freshman (9th grade) class to relieve overcrowding at SLHS. The freshman campus, which opened in 2010, is named the "Fred T. Korematsu (FTK) Campus" after civil rights activist Fred Korematsu, who had significant connections to San Leandro. The FTK campus is located at 13701 Bancroft Avenue, one block from the main campus. As of the 2017–2018 school year, the campus had its status removed as a 9th grade only campus and now houses the math and foreign language department for all grade levels, with some exceptions.

In 2011, with funding from the voter-approved Measure B school bond, the new Arts Education Center opened. The building contains a state of the art green screen room and control room, two sound booths, five classrooms, and a 552-seat performing arts theater.

Fine arts
Visual arts classes offered at San Leandro High School include drawing, sculpture, and fashion design. The music program features marching band, jazz band, wind ensemble, freshmen band, freshmen orchestra, advanced orchestra, choir, and Notables. The drama department puts on theater and musical productions each fall and spring. The San Leandro Academy for Multimedia (SLAM) includes courses in photography, videography, and multimedia.

Athletics
Sports available at the school include football, cross-country, tennis, golf, volleyball, water polo, basketball, soccer, wrestling, track and field, swimming, badminton, baseball, and softball.

Notable alumni
Chris Cannizzaro, former MLB catcher (New York Mets, San Diego Padres).
Jared Cunningham, NBA guard (Sacramento Kings). 
Tamara De Treaux, actress who played the title character in motion scenes in E.T. the Extra-Terrestrial.
Dennis Dixon, former NFL quarterback (Pittsburgh Steelers, Baltimore Ravens and Buffalo Bills). During his senior season of high school in 2002, Dixon threw for 2,426 yards and 30 touchdowns and led the Pirates to a 12–1 season.
Curtis Goodwin, former MLB outfielder (Cincinnati Reds, Baltimore Orioles).
Arthur Larsen, tennis player, ranked number 1 in the U.S. in 1950 and number 3 in 1955.
Charles Leno, Jr., NFL offensive lineman (Chicago Bears).
Russell Means, leader of the American Indian Movement.
Julian Nash, former MLS forward (San Jose Earthquakes, Houston Dynamo).
Jarrad Page, former NFL safety (Kansas City Chiefs, New England Patriots, Minnesota Vikings) and minor league baseball outfielder (Los Angeles Dodgers).
Dawn Robinson, singer; founding member of R&B vocal group En Vogue. 
Tim Stokes, former NFL offensive lineman (Washington Redskins, Green Bay Packers).
Marviel Underwood, former NFL safety (Oakland Raiders, Green Bay Packers).
Icehouse Wilson, former MLB player (Detroit Tigers) and college football player (St. Mary's College)
Queenie Mae Villaluz, singer, member of Pop vocal group Boys World

References

External links
  School Website

High schools in Alameda County, California
San Leandro, California
Educational institutions established in 1949
Public high schools in California
Buildings and structures in San Leandro, California
1950 establishments in California